Eduard Weyr (June 22, 1852 – July 23, 1903) was a Czech mathematician now chiefly remembered as the discoverer of a certain canonical form for square matrices over algebraically closed fields.  Weyr presented this form briefly in a paper published in 1885. He followed it up with a more elaborate treatment in a paper published in 1890. This particular  canonical form has been named as the Weyr canonical form in a paper by Shapiro published in The American Mathematical Monthly in 1999. Previously, this form has been variously called as modified Jordan form, reordered Jordan form, second Jordan form, and H-form.

Weyr's father was a mathematician at a secondary school in Prague, and his older brother, Emil Weyr, was also a mathematician. Weyr studied at Prague Polytechnic and Charles-Ferdinand University in Prague. He received his doctorate from the University of Göttingen in 1873 with dissertation Über algebraische Raumcurven. After a short spell in Paris studying under Charles Hermite and Joseph Alfred Serret, he returned to Prague where he eventually became a professor at Charles-Ferdinand University. Weyr also published research in geometry, in particular projective and differential geometry. In 1893 in Chicago, his paper Sur l'équation des lignes géodésiques was read (but not by him) at the International Congress of Mathematicians held in connection with the World's Columbian Exposition.

Weyr canonical form 
The image shows an example of a general Weyr matrix consisting of two blocks each of which is a basic Weyr matrix. The basic Weyr matrix in the top-left corner has the structure (4,2,1) and the other one has the structure (2,2,1,1).

References 

19th-century Czech people
Austro-Hungarian mathematicians
Czech mathematicians
Mathematicians from Prague
Charles University alumni
1852 births
1903 deaths
University of Göttingen alumni
Academic staff of Charles University
Linear algebraists